Bacchisa kraatzii is a species of beetle in the family Cerambycidae. It was described by Thomson in 1865. It is known from Java and the Philippines.

Subspecies
 Bacchisa kraatzii kraatzii (Thomson, 1865)
 Bacchisa kraatzii pallida (Thomson, 1865)

References

K
Beetles described in 1865